Las Lajas is a shield volcano located in the central part of Nicaragua,  north of Lake Nicaragua. Comarca las Lajas is among a number of communities lying within the volcano's caldera.

See also

List of volcanoes in Nicaragua

References 

Mountains of Nicaragua
Shield volcanoes of Nicaragua
Boaco Department
Polygenetic shield volcanoes